Diastatea is a genus of plants native to Latin America, mostly in Mexico and Central America but with one species extending southward along the Andes to Argentina.

Diastatea costaricensis McVaugh - Guatemala, Honduras, Nicaragua, Costa Rica 
Diastatea expansa McVaugh - central Mexico
Diastatea ghiesbreghtii (Kuntze) E.Wimm - southwestern Mexico
Diastatea micrantha (Kunth) McVaugh - widespread from central Mexico to the Jujuy region of northern Argentina
Diastatea tenera (A.Gray) McVaugh - southern Mexico and Guatemala
Diastatea virgata Scheidw. - southern Mexico

References

External links

Lobelioideae
Campanulaceae genera